Talmadge Richardson was an American baseball pitcher in the Negro leagues. He played with Bacharach Giants in 1921, the Richmond Giants in 1922, and the Baltimore Black Sox in 1923.

References

External links
 and Baseball-Reference Black Baseball stats and Seamheads

Bacharach Giants players
Baltimore Black Sox players
Richmond Giants players
Year of birth unknown
Year of death unknown
Baseball pitchers